This is a list of members of the Victorian Legislative Council between 1982 and 1985. As half of the Legislative Council's terms expired at each triennial election, half of these members were elected at the 1979 state election with terms expiring in 1985, while the other half were elected at the 1982 state election with terms expiring in 1988.

 Labor candidate Tony Van Vliet was elected as the member for Waverley at the 1982 state election but died on 16 October 1982 before he could be sworn in. Labor candidate Brian Mier won the resulting by-election on 4 December 1982.
 In April 1983, East Yarra Liberal MLC Bill Campbell resigned. Liberal candidate Mark Birrell won the resulting by-election on 7 May 1983.
 In October 1984, North Eastern National MLC Bill Baxter resigned to contest the federal seat of Indi at the 1984 election. No by-election was held due to the proximity of the 1985 state election.

Sources
 Re-member (a database of all Victorian MPs since 1851). Parliament of Victoria.

Members of the Parliament of Victoria by term
20th-century Australian politicians